Chalarus marki is a species of fly in the family Pipunculidae.

Distribution
Europe.

References

Pipunculidae
Insects described in 2008
Diptera of Europe